Grin and Bear It is a 1954 Disney animated short featuring Donald Duck. It is the third appearance of Humphrey the Bear.

Plot
Donald Duck is on his way to Brownstone National Park to have "fun, fun, fun". Meanwhile, the park ranger gathers all the bears and assigns each of them to associate with a park visitor; any bear who commits a crime in the park will suffer "the supreme penalty" (i.e., being executed and made into a bearskin rug). When all the bears pick their visitor, Humphrey is stuck with Donald. At first, he attempts to earn some of Donald's food by dancing but to no avail. He does earn Donald's attention when helping him set up his picnic and assorting his sandwiches for him, but goes unrewarded. Humphrey finally helps himself to some of Donald's food, mistakenly swallowing a hot red pepper, and cools down by drinking from a nearby waterfall. Donald then leaves the park, so Humphrey follows Donald out onto the road, draws a tire mark on himself, and makes Donald believe he ran him over. Donald gives Humphrey his food, but soon realizes he has been tricked. Donald then calls for the ranger, and he and Humphrey fight with each other and drop all the food on the road, and the ranger assigns them to clean it up. In the process, the ranger tries to steal the ham, but gets caught out by Donald and Humphrey, who shake their fingers at him to remind him that stealing is prohibited.

Voice cast
 Donald Duck: Clarence Nash
 Humphrey the Bear: Jimmy MacDonald
 J. Audubon Woodlore: Bill Thompson

Production
When the ranger shows the bears "the supreme penalty", the notes of the Dragnet theme was played.

Home media
The short was released on November 11, 2008, on Walt Disney Treasures: The Chronological Donald, Volume Four: 1951-1961.

See also
Rugged Bear
Bearly Asleep
Hooked Bear
In the Bag

References

External links
 
 

1954 films
1954 animated films
Donald Duck short films
1950s Disney animated short films
Films directed by Jack Hannah
Films produced by Walt Disney
Animated films about bears
Films scored by Oliver Wallace
1950s English-language films